Beaufort-Blavincourt is a commune in the Pas-de-Calais department in the Hauts-de-France region in northern France.

Geography
A farming village located 13 miles (21 km) west of Arras on the D78 road.

Population

Sights
 The church of the Holy Trinity at Beaufort, dating from the nineteenth century.
 The church of St. Pierre at Blavincourt, dating from the sixteenth century.
 Vestiges of a castle and a feudal motte.

See also
Communes of the Pas-de-Calais department

References

Communes of Pas-de-Calais